Steven Robert Susskind (October 3, 1942 – January 21, 2005) was an American actor who appeared in numerous small parts in sitcoms, such as Seinfeld, Frasier, Married... with Children, Scrubs, and NewsRadio.

Career
Susskind also performed as an actor and a voice actor in several films, such as Friday the 13th Part III, Star Trek V: The Final Frontier, Monsters, Inc., The Emperor's New Groove and Osmosis Jones; and the video games Terminator 3: Rise of the Machines and Dead to Rights. He was Father Karambetsos in Friends.

He also sang with The Roommates, who had hit records with "Please Love Me Forever" (with Cathy Jean) and "The Glory of Love" in 1961.

Death
Susskind died on January 21, 2005, in an automobile accident in Sunland, California. His body was cremated. He was 62 years old.

Filmography

Film

Television

Video games

References

External links
 

1942 births
2005 deaths
American male film actors
American male voice actors
Jewish American male actors
Road incident deaths in California
Male actors from Massachusetts
Actors from Springfield, Massachusetts
20th-century American male actors
20th-century American Jews
21st-century American Jews